Mauro Barni (born 1965, in Prato) is an Italian engineer and professor.

He graduated at University of Florence in 1991. In September 1998, he became associate professor at University of Siena, and then full professor. Barni was named Fellow of the Institute of Electrical and Electronics Engineers (IEEE) in 2012 «for contributions to signal and image processing for multimedia security».

References

External links 
Mauro Barni at Google Scholar

Fellow Members of the IEEE
Italian engineers
Living people
1965 births